Fyning Moor is a  biological Site of Special Scientific Interest south of Fyning in West Sussex.

This is a base-rich and springline alder wood, which is a nationally uncommon woodland type. Open rides have diverse flora and there are fens on the margins of a river. There are three nationally uncommon fly species, Xylota abiens, Ctenophora bimaculata and Rhobdomastix hilaris.

The site is private land but it is crossed by footpaths.

References

Sites of Special Scientific Interest in West Sussex